Van Etten is a hamlet and census-designated place in Chemung County, New York, United States. It was a village that was absorbed by the Town of Van Etten on December 31, 2018. The population was 537 at the 2010 census. The name came from the two brothers who founded the village.

The village of Van Etten was in the town of Van Etten near its eastern town line. The village was northeast of Elmira and was part of the Elmira Metropolitan Statistical Area.

History
The village was founded around 1798 by James and Joshua Van Etten. Previously called "Halls Corners", at first the community was called "Van Ettenville", but was incorporated in 1876 as "Van Etten". The first railroad line arrived in 1871.

In 2017, the village of Van Etten voted to dissolve and rejoin the Town of Van Etten. As of the 2019 American Community Survey, the U.S. Census Bureau still lists Van Etten as a village.

Geography
Van Etten was located in northeastern Chemung County at  (42.19831, -76.554336).

New York State Route 34 intersects New York State Route 224 in the former village.

Demographics

At the 2000 census, there were 581 people, 228 households and 150 families residing in the former village. The population density was 668.6 per square mile (257.8/km2). There were 239 housing units at an average density of 275.0 per square mile (106.1/km2). The racial makeup of the former village was 98.28% White, 0.17% Black or African American, 0.69% Native American, 0.17% Asian, and 0.69% from two or more races.

There were 228 households, of which 36.0% had children under the age of 18 living with them, 43.9% were married couples living together, 17.1% had a female householder with no husband present, and 33.8% were non-families. 27.2% of all households were made up of individuals, and 13.2% had someone living alone who was 65 years of age or older. The average household size was 2.55 and the average family size was 3.03.

Age distribution was 30.1% under the age of 18, 8.1% from 18 to 24, 25.6% from 25 to 44, 22.4% from 45 to 64, and 13.8% who were 65 years of age or older. The median age was 34 years. For every 100 females, there were 88.0 males. For every 100 females age 18 and over, there were 87.1 males.

The median household income was $27,955 and the median family income was $35,769. Males had a median income of $23,125 versus $30,417 for females. The per capita income for the village was $12,223. About 10.3% of families and 15.0% of the population were below the poverty line, including 14.9% of those under age 18 and 7.7% of those age 65 or over.

References

External links
 Village website

Villages in New York (state)
Villages in Chemung County, New York
Populated places disestablished in 2018
Former villages in New York (state)